Adult Contemporary is a chart published by Billboard ranking the top-performing songs in the United States in the adult contemporary music (AC) market. The chart debuted in the issue of Billboard dated July 17, 1961 under the title Easy Listening.  Initially the listing was compiled simply by extracting from the magazine's all-genre chart, the Hot 100, those songs which were deemed to fit under the Easy Listening banner and ranking them according to their placings on the Hot 100.  In 1961 seven different songs topped the Easy Listening chart in 24 issues of the magazine.

The number one song on the first Easy Listening chart was "The Boll Weevil Song" by Brook Benton, which was at number 2 on the Hot 100 that week.  Benton had achieved a string of chart-toppers on the R&B chart, but "The Boll Weevil Song" would prove to be his only Easy Listening number one.  The song held the top spot on the new chart for three weeks before being replaced by "Together" by Connie Francis.

The longest-running Easy Listening number one of 1961 was "Big Bad John" by Jimmy Dean, which spent the final ten weeks of the year in the top spot.  The song was a multi-genre chart-topper, also reaching number one on the country chart as well as the Hot 100.  It was one of three songs to top the Hot 100 as well as the Easy Listening chart during the year, along with "Wooden Heart" by Joe Dowell and "Michael" by The Highwaymen.  As the chart was in its infancy and no act had more than one number one during 1961, every number one of the year was the first Easy Listening chart-topper for the artist.  "Mexico" by Bob Moore and his Orchestra, which topped the chart for a single week, would prove to be the only appearance for Moore on both the Easy Listening chart and the Hot 100.  Moore, whose primary instrument was the bass guitar, was better known as a backing musician for other artists, including Elvis Presley and Bob Dylan.

Chart history

References

1961
1961 record charts